Leonard Ray Brown Jr. (born December 12, 1962) is a former American football coach and guard who played 20 seasons in the NFL. He last served as the offensive line coach for the Arizona Cardinals of the National Football League (NFL). He played college football for The University of Memphis and transferred to Arkansas State University. Brown was drafted by the St. Louis Cardinals in the eighth round of the 1986 NFL Draft. He also played for the Washington Redskins, San Francisco 49ers, and Detroit Lions over 20 seasons.

Playing career

Early years

Following graduation from Marion High School where he started at running back and tight end, he played college football for The University of Memphis and transferred to Arkansas State University where Coach Larry Lacewell converted him to an offensive lineman.

National Football League

St Louis Cardinals

Brown was drafted in the eighth round of the 1986 draft by the St. Louis Cardinals. He wore number 62 with the Cardinals. In 1986 he played in 11 games, starting 4. In 1987 he played in 7 games. In 1988, with the Phoenix Cardinals he played 15 games.

Washington Redskins

In 1989 Brown signed with the Washington Redskins. He played 7 games that season. In 1990 he did not play in any games. In 1991 he missed the whole season because of an elbow injury. He came back the next season and over the next 4 seasons, he played in every game.

San Francisco 49ers

In 1996, Brown played with the 49ers. He played in all 16 games. In 1997 he played in 15 out of 16 games. In his 13th year in the NFL, he played all 16 games at the age of 35. He played in three more seasons for the 49ers, and even made the pro bowl in 2001.

Detroit Lions

Ray Brown played 2 seasons with the Detroit Lions from 2002-2003.

Washington Redskins (2nd Stint)

Brown played in 2004 and in 2005 with the Redskins. He announced his retirement January 14, 2006 after 20 seasons, the same day he started a playoff game for the Redskins. He is one of the oldest players to start a playoff game at the age of 43.

Coaching career

Washington Redskins

Brown was a special assistant coach for the Washington Redskins in 2006.

Buffalo Bills

Brown was hired as assistant offensive line coach for the Buffalo Bills on January 17, 2008.  He was not retained by the Bills after the firing of head coach Dick Jauron.

San Francisco 49ers

Brown was hired as offensive line coach for the San Francisco 49ers for the 2010 season.

Carolina Panthers

On January 25, 2011, Brown was announced as the assistant line coach for the Carolina Panthers.

In the 2015 season, Brown and the Panthers reached Super Bowl 50 on February 7, 2016. The Panthers fell to the Denver Broncos by a score of 24–10.

Arizona Cardinals

On February 14, 2018, Brown was hired by the Arizona Cardinals as their offensive line coach.

Notes and references

External links
 Carolina Panthers bio
 Buffalo Bills bio
 

1962 births
Living people
American football offensive guards
American football offensive tackles
Arkansas State Red Wolves football players
Buffalo Bills coaches
Carolina Panthers coaches
Detroit Lions players
Memphis Tigers football players
Phoenix Cardinals players
San Francisco 49ers coaches
San Francisco 49ers players
St. Louis Cardinals (football) players
Washington Redskins players
National Conference Pro Bowl players
People from Marion, Arkansas
Players of American football from Arkansas
African-American coaches of American football
African-American players of American football
National Football League replacement players
21st-century African-American people
20th-century African-American sportspeople